The 2015 World Single Distance Speed Skating Championships was held between 12 and 15 February 2015 in Heerenveen, Netherlands.

Schedule

Source:schaatsen.nl

Participating nations
161 speed skaters from 23 nations participated. The number of speed skaters per nation that competed is shown in parentheses.

Medal summary

Medal table

Men's events

Women's events

References

 
2015 Single Distance
World Single Distance Speed Skating Championships
World Single Distance Speed Skating Championships
World Single Distance, 2015
World Single Distance Speed Skating Championships
World Single Distance Speed Skating Championships, 2015